Sir Nicholas Lavender (born 7 August 1964) is a British High Court judge.

Lavender was born in Barnsley and was educated at Queen Elizabeth Grammar School in Wakefield. He completed a BA at Corpus Christi College, Cambridge in 1987 and a BCL at Oriel College, Oxford.

He was called to the bar at Inner Temple in 1986 and took silk in 2008. He practised from Serle Court chambers. He served as a recorder from 2010 to 2016, a deputy High Court judge from 2013 to 2016. He was Chair of the Bar Council in 2014.

On 3 October 2016, he was appointed a High Court judge and assigned to the Queen's Bench Division and took the customary knighthood in the same year. He has served as Presiding Judge of the North Eastern circuit since 2019. 

In 2002, he married Anuja Dhir (a circuit judge) with whom he has two sons and one daughter.

References 

Living people
1964 births
21st-century English judges
Knights Bachelor
Alumni of Oriel College, Oxford
Alumni of Corpus Christi College, Cambridge
Members of the Inner Temple
People educated at Queen Elizabeth Grammar School, Wakefield
21st-century King's Counsel
English King's Counsel
Lawyers from Yorkshire